Friedrich Gedike (15 January 1754, Boberow bei Karstädt (Prignitz) (Mark Brandenburg) – 2 May 1803, Berlin) was a German theologian, teacher and educational reformer of the late Age of Enlightenment. He was the recipient of the letters that made up the book by C. P. Moritz entitled Journeys of a German in England in 1782.

Life
Gedike came from an old family of theologians. His grandfather, Lambert Gedicke, was the Feldpropst (chief military chaplain) of the Prussian Army, and Simon Gedi(c)ke, Chief Chaplain to the Prince-Elector, Joachim II Hector, Elector of Brandenburg. Ludwig Gedike, later headmaster of the Leipzig Bürgerschule, Ludwig Gedike, was Friedrich's younger brother.

Works
Aristoteles und Basedow. 1779
Schulschriften., two volumes, 1789 and 1795
Vermischte Schriften. 1801

References

Bibliography
Heinrich Julius Kämmel: Gedike, Friedrich. In: Allgemeine Deutsche Biographie (ADB). Band 8, Duncker & Humblot, Leipzig 1878, S. 487–490.
Fritz Borinski: Gedike, Friedrich. In: Neue Deutsche Biographie (NDB). Band 6, Duncker & Humblot, Berlin 1964, S. 125 f. (Digitalisat).
Gerd Biegel: „Dieser Professor ist ganz unnütz für die Universität“. Die braunschweigische Landesuniversität Helmstedt im Bericht des „Universitätsbereisers“ Friedrich Gedike aus dem Jahr 1789 (= Braunschweiger Museumsvorträge. Bd. 4). Braunschweigisches Landesmuseum, Braunschweig 2003, .
Elena Barnert: Headhunter Seiner Majestät. Der „Universitäts-Bereiser“ Friedrich Gedike evaluiert Deutschlands Professoren für Preußens Universitäten. In: Rechtsgeschichte. Bd. 4 (2004), S. 256−263.
Andreas Fritsch: Fríedrich Gedike wiederentdeckt. Ein großer „Philologe und Schulmann“ des 18. Jahrhunderts. In: Forum Classicum. Bd. 3 (2008), S. 166–179.

External links
https://portal.dnb.de/opac.htm?method=simpleSearch&query=116478799
Biografie von Friedrich Gedike im Prignitzlexikon 
Ueber den Begriff einer Bürgerschule, 1799 (PDF-Datei; 134 kB)

1754 births
1803 deaths
18th-century German Christian theologians
German male non-fiction writers
18th-century German writers
18th-century German male writers
19th-century German writers
19th-century German male writers